Beauty World MRT station is an underground Mass Rapid Transit (MRT) station on the Downtown Line (DTL) in Bukit Timah, Singapore. Located along Upper Bukit Timah Road, this station took its name from the historic Beauty World, an amusement park and market that once stood in the vicinity. Beauty World station primarily serves the residential estates along Jalan Jurong Kechil and Toh Yi Drive, as well as Beauty World Centre, Beauty World Plaza and Bukit Timah Shopping Centre. It is also within walking distances to Ngee Ann Polytechnic, Bukit Timah market & food centre, Bukit Timah Community Club, Bukit Timah Tua Pek Kong Temple and Bee Low See Temple.

The section of tracks between this station and Hillview MRT station is the longest between any two MRT stations on the Downtown Line till 2025. There are basic structural provisions for a future station (also known as a "box station") along this section of tracks near Hume Avenue. Hume MRT station was confirmed on 7 March 2019 and is to be operational by 2025.

History

The station was first announced in July 2008 when the DTL2 stations were announced.

Tunnelling works began on 8 June 2011. Two tunnel boring machines — which were named Athena and Artemis, after the Greek goddesses by students of the nearby Pei Hwa Presbyterian Primary School — tunnelled the  stretch from Beauty World to King Albert Park.

Station details

Etymology
The original name for "Beauty World" referred to an amusement park in the area. At that time, amusement parks were called "worlds": the others included Gay World, Great World (which Great World City now occupies), and New World. The amusement park was subsequently converted to a market after the end of World War II, and called Beauty World Market. However, fire hazards led to the subsequent demolition of the park in the 1980s.

The station was also named after the Beauty World Centre. Other names such as Anak Bukit and Seventh Mile were considered before the name Beauty World was selected.

Art in Transit
"Asemic Lines" by Boedi Widjaja is an artwork that presents the multi-cultural mix of language and invites viewers' aesthetic intuition to 'hover' between reading and looking.

Exits
A: Bukit Timah Nature Reserve, Bukit Timah Shopping Centre, Beauty World Plaza, Beauty World Centre, Church of Singapore, Goh & Goh Building, UOB Centre & wheelchair accessible
B: Bukit Timah Tua Pek Kong Temple, Dimensions International College (Bukit Timah Campus), Kilat Centre, JK Building, Sweebi House & wheelchair accessible
C: Bukit Timah Market & Food Centre, Bukit Timah Plaza, Bukit Timah CC, Glory Presbyterian Church, Ngee Ann Polytechnic, Pei Hwa Presbyterian Primary School & wheelchair accessible, The Reserve Residences.

References

External links

SBS official website

Railway stations in Singapore opened in 2015
Bukit Timah
Mass Rapid Transit (Singapore) stations